Christophe-Alphonse Geoffrion,  (November 23, 1843 – July 18, 1899) was a Canadian lawyer, professor, and politician.

Born in Varennes, Canada East, the son of Félix Geoffrion and Catherine Brodeur, he was the brother of Félix Geoffrion, a notary and politician. He graduated with a Bachelor of Civil Law degree from McGill College in 1866 and was called to the bar in 1866. A practicing lawyer, he also taught at McGill. When his brother died in 1894, he was acclaimed in the resulting 1895 by-election in the riding of Verchères. From 1896 to 1899, he was a Minister without Portfolio in the cabinet of Wilfrid Laurier. He died while in office in 1899. His brother, Victor Geoffrion was acclaimed to the seat after his death.

References
 
 

1843 births
1899 deaths
Lawyers in Quebec
Liberal Party of Canada MPs
Members of the House of Commons of Canada from Quebec
Members of the King's Privy Council for Canada
Academic staff of McGill University
People from Varennes, Quebec
McGill University Faculty of Law alumni